Morris Run is an unincorporated community in Hamilton Township, Tioga County, Pennsylvania, United States. Morris Run has a post office with ZIP code 16939.

References

Unincorporated communities in Tioga County, Pennsylvania
Unincorporated communities in Pennsylvania